MTFF can refer to:

 mean time to first failure, a concept in reliability engineering
 Man-Tended Free Flyer, an abandoned plan for an ESA space station